Way Back Home is a 1931 American Pre-Code drama film directed by William A. Seiter and starring Phillips Lord, Effie Palmer, Frank Albertson, and Bette Davis. The screenplay by Jane Murfin is based on characters created for the NBC Radio show Seth Parker by Phillips Lord.

Plot
A decade earlier, Jonesport, Maine preacher Seth Parker and his wife took in motherless infant Robbie Turner after he was abandoned by his sadistic alcoholic father Rufe; young Robbie has always considered the Parkers his parents. Mary Lucy Duffy, whose father has banished her from their home for fraternizing with farmhand David Clark, is also living with the Parkers, and her romance with David attracts the attention of the local gossips. David's mother had run off with a stranger years earlier, and when she returned to Jonesport with an illegitimate infant son, they were shunned by the townspeople.

Mary Lucy and David plan to elope to Bangor, but Seth encourages them to stay by offering to pay for a proper wedding. Rufe breaks into the Parker home to kidnap Robbie, attacking Mary Lucy when she tries to protect the boy. Seth pursues Rufe and Robbie and manages to intercept them before they board a train. Because Seth is not Robbie's legal guardian, the boy is placed in an orphanage until a decision can be made about his future. Meanwhile, Seth lectures the townspeople about tolerance and implores them to accept Rose and her newlywed son and his bride. Robbie returns to Jonesport, having been legally entrusted to the Parkers' care.

Cast
 Phillips Lord as Seth Parker
 Effie Palmer as Mother Parker
 Frank Albertson as David Clark
 Bette Davis as Mary Lucy Duffy
 Frankie Darro as Robbie
 Dorothy Peterson as Rose Clark
 Stanley Fields as Rufe Turner
 Oscar Apfel as Wobbling Duffy
 Bennett Kilpack as Cephus

Production
Phillips Lord had created the character of preacher and folksy philosopher Seth Parker for a Sunday night series broadcast by NBC Radio. Its popularity led RKO Radio Pictures to purchase the film rights and assign Jane Murfin to write a screenplay with Parker and his wife as the central characters. Originally entitled Other People's Business, it drew criticism from a studio script reader, who thought the plot was dated and noted, "A story of this type should never take itself seriously, for the day when pictures like The Old Homestead [a 1915 Famous Players film focused on a popular New England vaudevillian] would grip the attention of a movie audience is lost forever." The reader cited the commercial failure of Check and Double Check, a 1930 feature inspired by Amos 'n' Andy, as proof radio shows did not necessarily adapt well for the screen, and noted most Seth Parker listeners were "those people who are interested in the singing of hymns, old folk songs, and a very simple brand of humor" and that the "average young person, between the ages of fifteen and thirty, who form a very large percentage of the movie audiences, do not listen to the broadcast." Despite the readers's misgivings, RKO supervising producer Pandro S. Berman greenlighted the project and budgeted it at $400,000.

Berman negotiated with Universal Pictures for the loan of Bette Davis, whose contract with the studio just had been renewed following her completion of Waterloo Bridge, and Carl Laemmle, Jr. agreed to loan her out for a fee of $300 per week. Davis was pleased with the attention paid to her by cinematographer J. Roy Hunt. "I was truly overjoyed," she later recalled. "Plus the part I played was an important one - and a charming one. It gave me some confidence in myself for the first time since leaving the theater in New York."

The film was shot on location in Santa Cruz, California because of the small town's New England-like atmosphere. Motion Picture Herald reviewed it as Other People's Business, the title under which it was released in Great Britain, although domestically it was changed to Way Back Home when Phillips Lord published his book Seth Parker & His Jonesport Folks: Way Back Home to coincide with the release of the film.

Critical reception
Andre Sennwald of The New York Times observed, "Seth Parker, the radio sage, is shedding a rather appealing sweetness and light ... in his first motion picture ... [His] following will not be disappointed and those who do not know the character will find a gentle and frequently moving entertainment." In later years, Bette Davis commented, "I'm glad Sennwald felt about it as he did. He obviously accepted it for what it was meant to be - not a masterpiece, just a slice of Yankee village life."

Variety thought "As entertainment the film is unbelievably bad. The story is strictly an old-style proposed tearjerker. It runs 81 minutes which seem like 181."

Preservation
A print is housed in the Library of Congress collection. Warner Bros., which owns the RKO library, has preserved the film, which airs occasionally on Turner Classic Movies.

References

External links
 
 
 
 

RKO Pictures films
1931 films
1931 drama films
American drama films
Films based on radio series
Films set in Maine
American black-and-white films
Films directed by William A. Seiter
Films scored by Max Steiner
Films shot in California
Films with screenplays by Jane Murfin
1930s American films